U.S. Route 385 (US 385) is a north-south U.S. highway that runs from Big Bend National Park in Texas to Deadwood, South Dakota. In Texas, the highway runs from Big Bend National Park to the Oklahoma state line, north of Dalhart. US 385 is part of the La Entrada al Pacifico trade corridor from Interstate 10 in Fort Stockton to Interstate 20 in Odessa.

Route description

US 385 begins at Big Bend National Park near the Persimmon Gap Visitor Center. About 40 miles to the north, the highway intersects US 90 in the town of Marathon, sharing a short overlap with that highway. In Fort Stockton, US 385 begins an overlap with Interstate 10 and US 67. At I-10 exit 273, US 67/385 end their overlap with the interstate, running in a northeast direction. US 385 ends its overlap with US 67 in McCamey, running in a slight northwest direction. The highway intersects with Interstate 20, entering into the city of Odessa. US 385 runs through the city, leaving it just south of the northern intersection with Loop 338. 

In Seminole, US 385 begins an overlap with US 62, with the two highways running through Seagraves together. US 62 leaves the highway in Brownfield, with US 385 running in a mostly north direction. The highway enters the town of Levelland, running along the western boundary of South Plains College; after intersecting with SH 114 US 385 leaves the town. In Littlefield, US 385 shares a short overlap with Loop 430 around the downtown area. North of Littlefield, the highway runs through mainly rural areas, passing through the towns of Springlake and Sunnyside. North of Dimmitt, US 385 begins running through the panhandle section of Texas and becomes less rural. North of Hereford, the highway becomes a rural route once again. From Vega to Channing US 385 makes a backwards c-shape, crossing the Canadian River in the process. US 385 runs through the Rita Blanca National Grassland, before entering into Oklahoma.

Major intersections

See also

References

Transportation in Andrews County, Texas
Transportation in Brewster County, Texas
Transportation in Castro County, Texas
Transportation in Crane County, Texas
Transportation in Crockett County, Texas
Transportation in Dallam County, Texas
Transportation in Deaf Smith County, Texas
Transportation in Ector County, Texas
Transportation in Gaines County, Texas
Transportation in Hartley County, Texas
Transportation in Hockley County, Texas
Transportation in Lamb County, Texas
Transportation in Oldham County, Texas
Transportation in Pecos County, Texas
Transportation in Terry County, Texas
Transportation in Upton County, Texas
85-3
3 in Texas